Gregory of Rimini (c. 1300 – November 1358), also called Gregorius de Arimino or Ariminensis, was one of the great scholastic philosophers and theologians of the Middle Ages.  He was the first scholastic writer to unite the Oxonian and Parisian traditions in 14th-century philosophy, and his work had a lasting influence in the Late Middle Ages and Reformation.  His scholastic nicknames were Doctor acutus and Doctor authenticus.

His views strongly influenced some of the Protestant Reformers.

Life
Gregory was born in Rimini around 1300.  He joined the Order of the Hermits of Saint Augustine before studying theology in the 1320s at the University of Paris, where he encountered the ideas of the late Franciscan Peter Auriol.  In the 1330s he taught at Augustinian schools in Bologna, Padua and Perugia, where he became familiar with the recent work of Oxford thinkers such as Adam Wodeham, William Ockham, and Walter Chatton.  He returned to Paris in 1342 to prepare his lectures on Peter Lombard's Sentences, which he delivered in 1342–1344.  Because of his familiarity with English philosophy during this time, he effectively transmitted contemporary Oxford ideas—with an Augustinian tinge—to Paris.  He became a Master of Theology in 1345 and subsequently taught at schools in Padua and Rimini.  Gregory died in Vienna in 1358 shortly after being named General of his Order.

Philosophy
In his lifetime, Gregory composed a number of philosophical works including analytical tables to accompany his own lectures, tables on Saint Augustine's works, and a few governmental letters.  Yet, his most important works are the lectures on Books I and II of Peter Lombard's Sentences.  (This should have been on the four books, but books III and IV seem to have been lost, or were never written).

Many later scholastics copied long passages from his works. Those who borrowed from him or were influenced by him include the Cistercian James of Eltville, Pierre d'Ailly, and Henry of Langenstein.

Augustinianism
The most important influence in Gregory's thought was St Augustine.  Gregory read Augustine more carefully and extensively than his predecessors, and so was able to attack Auriol for his faulty citations and quotations of Augustine, as well as for his Semipelagianism.  Gregory adhered to Augustine's predestination and famously condemned unbaptised infants to Hell, for which he gained the nickname Infantium Tortor (torturer, or tormentor, of infants). Gregory taught the doctrines of double predestination and limited atonoment.

Theory of sentences
Initially, with the intention of defining theology and natural sciences, Rimini developed a theory of sentences to describe scientific knowledge.  He believed sentences neither to be extra-mental nor propositional; in this theory, sentences signify something exclusively by the make-up of their terms, but are neither reducible to individual terms nor are "mental sentences" identifiable.  Defenders of this view claim that beliefs about the world are too complicated to correspond to specific language structures and thus, cannot serve as objects of scientific knowledge.

Nominalism
Gregory Rimini had a unique take on traditional nominalist views.  He thought that to contrive understanding in physical reality by incorporating abstract objects was nonsensical, due to his belief that mental objects are used strictly for convenient social conventions and nothing else.  With this divide between complex thought and physical reality, Rimini also believed statements describing infinitely many points, infinitely many lines, infinitely many planes, etc. are all false.  Since these are all mental, abstract objects, they only exist in the minds of people who think about them.  Thus, the notion of physical infinity is not applicable.  Furthermore, God was always in close relation to these abstract objects, too.  Rimini's nominalist view claims that God has the ability to distinguish abstract objects but has no need to manipulate them.  To Rimini, God has no need to manipulate mathematical propositions because he exists outside of time and thus, has no need to think deductively about the individual abstract objects anyway.

Works 

 Gregorii Ariminensis OESA Lectura super Primum et Secundum Sententiarum edited by A. Trapp et al., Berlin and New York: Walter de Gruyter.
 Tomus I: Super Primum (Dist. 1-6), 1981.
 Tomus II: Super Primum (Dist. 17-17), 1982.
 Tomus III: Super Primum (Dist. 19-48), 1984.
 Tomus IV: Super Secundum (Dist. 1-5), 1979.
 Tomus V: Super Secundum (Dist. 6-18), 1979.
 Tomus VI: Super Secundum (Dist. 24-44), 1980.
 Tomus VII: Indices, 1987.
Old editions:
 Gregorii Ariminiensis...super Primum et Secundum Sententiarum, Saint Bonaventure, NY:  Franciscan Institute, 1955 [reprint of 1494 edition].
 Gregorij Ariminiensis Ordonis Hermitaru[m] Diui Augustini ac Sacri Pagine Magistri in Secundo Sententiar[um] Admiranda Expositio, Milan, 1494.

 De usura
 
 De quatuor virtutibus cardinalibus
 De intentione et remissione formarum

References

Sources

Further reading
 Pascal Bermon, L'assentiment et son objet chez Grégoire de Rimini, Paris: Vrin, 2007.
 Hubert Elie, Le signifiable par complexe. La proposition et son objet. Grégoire de Rimini, Meinong, Russell, Paris: Vrin 2002 (new edition of "Le complexe significabile", published in 1936).  
 Heiko Oberman, (ed.), Gregor von Rimini:  Werk und Wirkung bis zur Reformation, Berlin and New York: Walter de Gruyter, 1981.
 Robert Pasnau, "Philosopher Biography: Gregory of Rimini", in Robert Pasnau (ed.), The Cambridge History of Medieval Philosophy, Cambridge: Cambridge University Press, 2010.
 Jack Zupko, "Gregory of Rimini", in Jorge J.E. Garcia and Timothy B. Noone (eds.), A Companion to Philosophy in the Middle Ages, Malden: Blackwell, 2003.

External links
 
 

1300s births
Year of birth uncertain
1358 deaths
Augustinian philosophers
Christian theologians
University of Paris alumni
Augustinian friars
Scholastic philosophers
14th-century Latin writers
14th-century Italian philosophers
Italian expatriates in France